Charles Philippe Jean-Pierre (born in Chicago, Illinois) is a Washington DC-based painter, who is known for his contemporary and traditional Haitian paintings as well as international street murals, collage work, and portraiture. According to East City Art, Jean-Pierre was a 2015 White House invitee for the role of art education in promoting national youth justice. Jean-Pierre currently serves as an art instructor for City Arts DC and is the National Art Director for Young & Powerful for President Barack Obama. 

Jean Pierre is an adjunct instructor at American University fine arts department. He is on the board of directors of Diaspora African Women's Network (DAWN).

Education 
He received his Masters of Arts from Howard University, where he honed his bold and introspective painting style.

Work 
Jean-Pierre's work centers around themes of beauty, power structures, feminism, masculinity, and race. Although he works in a variety of mediums, he most often creates acrylic paintings.

Murals 
According to the Rush Philanthropic Arts Foundation, Jean-Pierre has created public artworks in Chicago, DC, Istanbul, Panama, Port-au-Prince, London, and Paris. Here is a list of them below:
 Bronzeville Noir, 47th St. and Calumet St., Chicago, Illinois, 2012?
 Holy Rosary Roman Catholic Church, Third St. NW, Washington, D.C., 2013

Exhibitions 

 Les Jacmeliens IV, the Haitian Heritage Museum, Miami, Florida, December, 2014

References

External links
 Charles Philippe Jean-Pierre website
 Charles Philippe Jean-Pierre bio United States Department of State
 What's At Stake: Charles Philippe Jean-Pierre's Live Art Installation at 2015 Million Man March Black Entertainment Television (BET)
 Visual Stimulation: The Work Of Charles Jean-Pierre

Artists from Washington, D.C.
American contemporary artists